Platydoris macfarlandi is a species of sea slug, a dorid nudibranch, shell-less marine opisthobranch gastropod mollusks in the family Discodorididae.

Distribution
It has also been found in deep water at Redondo Canyon, Los Angeles County and at  depth at Bahia San Cristobal, Baja California, Mexico, .

References

Discodorididae
Gastropods described in 1951